Asgharabad (also Romanized as Aşgharābād) is a village in Bardesareh Rural District, Oshtorinan District, Borujerd County, Lorestan Province, Iran. At the 2006 census, its population was 65, in 13 families.

References 

Towns and villages in Borujerd County